Busk + Hertzog is a Danish design team created by Flemming Busk and Stephan Hertzog in 2000. They are well-known for their award-winning furniture designs. Both the designers; Flemming Busk and Stephan Hertzog are two of the most awarded Danish designers. They have won international design awards such as the Red Dot Awards, IF Awards, and Good Design Awards.

Busk + Hertzog is based in London, England.  Many designs of the team have been exhibited at design museums internationally. They are also included in the Danish Design Museum database for historic Danish Design and all of their designs are listed in the museum's online library.

History

Busk + Hertzog was founded in 2000 by Flemming Busk and Stephan Hertzog. Busk is a master in architecture and design from the School of Architecture in Aarhus, Denmark and Hertzog had experience in the textile industry. They met in Aarhus and have been designing together ever since. In the early years,  Busk worked as the designer and Hertzog worked on the business side of the team. Over the years, both have come to influence all aspects of the team. In 2010, the team moved to London in order to find new inspiration for their designs. In 2008 they were awarded the "Furniture Prize" at the Danish Museum of Art and Design in Copenhagen by the furniture industry in Denmark. The Furniture Prize was instituted by the Foundation of the Association of Furniture Manufacturers in 1969 ”.... to support and encourage initiative and efforts, made to promote design development, research and technical development for the Danish furniture industry...” as it says in the instrument of foundation. The prize was awarded for the first time in 1970 – and was awarded for the last time in 2009 - to The Danish Design Museum. Among the previous prize recipients are prominent design icons such as Arne Jacobsen, Hans J. Wegner, Børge Mogensen og Poul Kjærholm.

The design duo was in 2004 among the Danish designers taking part in the Danish Design Project at MoMa, New York where their "Lotus" chair was selected by Museum of Modern Art (MoMa) curators for the project.

Design style and influences

Busk + Hertzog's designs have been described as "clean" and "minimalist", yet sculptural, incorporating horizontal and vertical lines and geometric shapes. Their designs combine bold colors with clear indications of their Danish design heritage.

They also visit locations where their furniture is in use in order to receive inspiration. Busk has been quoted as saying, "to be allowed to sit in all anonymity and see that our design was actually used, as we had thought, was very large. We are honored to have prices, but we design furniture to be used by all, and therefore find it much more satisfying to meeting our products in real life."

Designs

Busk + Hertzog have designed furniture for retail sales as well as for major companies throughout  the world. Their work has been on display at the Royal House of Norway, the Museum of Modern Art in New York, the Norwegian Embassy in Helsinki, and the Carnegie Trust. Their work displayed at the Museum of Modern Art can be purchased as the museum shop in both New York and Japan. Their designs are included in the Design Within Reach catalog which sells furniture both online and in stores in the United States. They have also designed furniture for  CNN International headquarters in Atlanta, Georgia and Nordea in Stockholm, Sweden.

Awards

Busk + Hertzog have won a multitude of awards since its inception. Some of the most notable awards include the Red Dot Awards, IF Awards, and Good Design Awards. Most recently, they were given the IF Product Design Award for their "Bubbles" design awarded by International Forum Design.

 2013 Red Dot Product Design Award 2013 for "Penny Coat stand" 
 2013 Red Dot Product Design Award 2013 for "Rada shoe rack" 
 2013 IF Product Design Award 2013 for "Bubbles"
 2012 Good Design Award for ”Runway”
 2012 Good Design Award for ”Didi”
 2012 Good Design Award for ”Milo”
 2012 IF Product Design Award 2012 for ”Didi”
 2011 Good Design Award for "Penny"
 2011 Good Design Award for "True Love Outdoor"
 2011 Good Design Award for "Angel"
 2011 Design Award 2012 of the Federal Republic of Germany nominee for ”Capri”
 2011 IF Product Design Award for "Lulu"
 2010 Good Design Award for "Wishbone table"
 2010 Good Design Award for ”Lotus swivel”
 2010 Good Design Award for "Lulu"
 2010 Good Design Award for "Capri"
 2010 Good Design Award for "Call Ottomans"
 2010 IF Product Design Award 2010 for "Lotus swivel"
 2010 Red Dot Product Design award 2010 for ”Wishbone table”
 2010 Red Dot Product Design award 2010 for ”Capri”
 2010 Red Dot Product Design award 2010 for ”Lulu”
 2010 Red Dot Product Design award 2010 for ”Lotus swivel”
 2009 Good Design Award for '"Gala Chair"
 2009 Good Design Award for "True Love sofa"
 2009 Good Design Award for "Jet chair"
 2009 Good Design Award for "Door stops"
 2009 IF Product Design Award for "Camouflage"
 2009 Red Dot Product Design Award 2009 for "True Love Sofa"
 2009 Red Dot Product Design Award 2009 for "Gala chair"
 2009 Red Dot Product Design Award 2009 for "Door stops"
 2009 Red Dot Product Design Award 2009 for "Sputnik Tables" 
 2008 Awarded “The furniture prize” by the Foundation of the Danish furniture Industry.
 2008 Good Design Award for "Wishbone"
 2008 Good Design Award for "Plasma benches"
 2008 "Hello chair" selected for the permanent exhibition of Danish Museum of Art and Design  
 2008 Red Dot Product Design 2008 for “Wishbone”
 2008 Red Dot Product Design 2008 for “Camouflage”
 2008 IF Product Design Award 2008 for "Plasma"
 2007 "Hello chair" selected for the permanent exhibition of National Gallery / Design museum, Oslo, Norway 
 2004 Nominated to the ”Bo Bedre Design Award” “True Love” chair

See also
 Danish design
 Modern furniture
 List of furniture designers

Gallery
Select Images of Busk + Hertzog designs.

References

External links
 Busk + Hertzog Official Website

Danish designers
Furniture designers